Samuel Gary Clingan (born 13 January 1984) is a Northern Irish former international footballer who played as a defensive midfielder.

Club career

Early career
Clingan began his career in August 2001 as a youth trainee at Wolverhampton Wanderers. He was captain of the Wolves reserves in 2003–04, but never broke into the first team – although twice being an unused substitute during their Premier League campaign of that year – and was loaned out to Chesterfield on two occasions to gain experience. Between October 2004 and January 2006, he played 29 times for the Spireites and scored three goals – quickly becoming a fans' favourite.

Nottingham Forest
In early 2006, Nottingham Forest confirmed their interest in him. The original deal fell through because of the existing loan deal with Chesterfield, but when his loan period ended on 15 January, Forest made a second bid. Clingan joined Forest on 23 January for an undisclosed fee. He made his debut in a 2–0 defeat to Barnsley.

Clingan had been a regular in the Forest side in 2006–07 but sustained a broken ankle during a 5–1 victory over Huddersfield Town in early March 2007, sidelining him for the rest of the season. He returned fit for the next campaign and got his first goal for the Reds after 22 months and 59 games, with a 22-yard free-kick in a 2–0 win over Crewe on 24 November 2007. The season ended with Forest gaining automatic promotion to the Championship.

Clingan was offered a new deal by the club at the end of the season, with manager Colin Calderwood stating he hoped Clingan would re-sign. He rejected the offer from Forest amid interest from Championship rivals QPR, Ipswich Town and Norwich City.

Norwich City
On 17 June 2008, he agreed to join Norwich City when his Forest contract expired. He signed a two-year deal and was Glenn Roeder's first summer signing. During the 2008–09 season, Clingan became the club's established penalty taker, scoring all four spot-kicks he took. His other goals were an impressive free-kick in a 1–1 draw away to Birmingham City and a similar effort in the final day 4–2 defeat to Charlton Athletic which sealed the club's relegation to League One. In March, Clingan was soon appointed as Norwich City's vice captain, following Gary Doherty promotion as captain. In the January transfer window, Clingan revealed that Premier League side Fulham tried to sign him.

Following Norwich City's relegation, Clingan requested a transfer and was sold to Coventry City. He proclaimed that he wanted to play in the Premier League and Coventry offered him the best chance of getting there. Unfortunately for him, Coventry didn't make it to the Premier League. Two years later, however, Norwich City did secure promotion to the Premier League and Clingan was mercilessly taunted with cries of "Sammy Clingan, it could have been you." by Norwich City Supporters when the two clubs met on the last day of the championship season. He later admitted regretting leaving Norwich for Coventry.

Coventry City
After a protracted transfer saga in the summer transfer window, Clingan signed for Coventry City on 24 July 2009, signing a three-year deal for an undisclosed fee. He was happy to move to a Championship club. He made his debut, on the opening game of the season, in a 2–1 win over Ipswich Town. He then scored his first goal, on 19 September 2009, in a 3–2 loss against Preston. He then scored two goals in two consecutive games against Watford and Leicester City. Soon after, Clingan suffered a toe injury while in international duty, which left him out for six weeks. Two months later, on 12 December 2009, Clingan made his return from injury, coming on as a substitute 88th, in a 3–2 win over Peterborough United. Later in the season, Clingan would score against Barnsley and Scunthorpe United.

Following the last three games since the opening game of the season, Clingan said his first team place is difficult in the starting line-up, under manager Aidy Boothroyd. Eventually, his first team place would win over Boothyord, which earned him a starting line-up. He soon suffered a knee injury which left him out for months and made his return in early January. During the season, Clingan had problem with injuries.

In June 2011, due to the departures of Keiren Westwood, Marlon King and Aron Gunnarson, Sammy Clingan was announced as club captain. After scoring his first goal of the season against Doncaster on 29 October 2011, Clingan announced his desire to stay at the club and the contract negotiations has started. Like last season, Clingan had another problem with injuries.

In May 2012, Clingan rejected a new contract and was released by Coventry City when his contract ran out at the end of the 2011–2012 season.

Doncaster Rovers
He was without a club for the first few months of the 2012–13 season before signing a month by month contract for Doncaster Rovers on 26 October 2012. Clingan was linked with recently promoted side Charlton.

He played his first game, coming on as sub in the 83rd minute when Rovers were two up away against Notts County. Despite lack of appearance, Clingan says he desire to stay at Doncaster Rovers in November. He made his last appearance for the club – against his former club, Coventry City – on 15 December 2012, where he received a mixed reception from Coventry fans.

On 27 December 2012, it was confirmed that Clingan would not be offered an extension to his contract and would leave the club.

Kilmarnock
On 29 January 2013, Clingan signed an 18-month contract with SPL side Kilmarnock. Upon joining Kilmarnock, Clingan will be joined by compatriot Rory McKeown and manager Kenny Shiels.

A few weeks after joining the club, Clingan made his first start, in a 1–1 draw against Inverness Caledonian Thistle on 13 February 2013. A few weeks later, Clingan scored his first goal for the club, in a 2–2 draw against Hibernian. Two months later on 11 May 2013, Clingan scored his second goal of the season, in a 3–2 win over Dundee. Clingan made fourteen appearances and scoring two times in his first half of the season.

In the 2013–14 season, Clingan was a suffered a knee injury after a challenge during a friendly match against Carlisle United and was substituted. As a result, Clingan would be out for six weeks. After being sidelined for six weeks, Clingan made his return to the first team against Celtic on 28 September 2013, which he scored from a free-kick, which Kilmarnock lost 5–2. Despite the loss, Clingan said he will never forget the first time he played at Celtic Park. Since then, Clingan struggled to regain his first team, as he was on the substitute bench and has his own injury concern much further, as he made eighteen appearances and scoring once in his second season. Despite the injury, Clingan signed a 12 months contract with the club.

In 2014–15 season, Clingan started the season well when he scored his first goal of the season, in a 2–0 win over Motherwell on 22 August 2014. However, Clingan's playing time was soon reduced when he suffered a knee injury that kept him out for five weeks. Clingan made his first team return on 21 January 2015, in a 1–0 loss against Dundee. Three weeks later on 14 February 2015, Clingan scored the last minute goal, in a 3–2 win over Dundee United. Clingan continued to suffered two injuries towards the end of the season, as he made 27 appearances and scored two times in all competitions. At the end of the 2014–15 season, Clingan was released by the club.

Linfield

Having been without a club for the entire 2015–16 season, Clingan made his return to football by signing for NIFL Premiership side Linfield, linking up with former Northern Ireland colleagues David Healy and Roy Carroll.

Glenavon
Clingan left Linfield at the end of the 2016–17 season, and on 8 August 2017 it was announced that he had signed for Glenavon. His first goal for the club came in a 6–1 win over Ballymena United. Clingan's expertise from set pieces and penalties proved invaluable, scoring 12 goals as Glenavon ended the 2017–18 season with European qualification. Much of the following season, however, was disrupted by a long-term injury layoff which limited Clingan to just 10 appearances. Although Glenavon bettered the previous season's points total, a loss to Glentoran in the Europa League Playoff semi-final meant that they did not secure European football. On 23 June 2019, Clingan agreed another one-year deal at Glenavon, to the end of the 2019–20 season.

Clingan's contract with Glenavon expired at the end of the 2019–20 season. However, following full recovery from a calf injury, Clingan re-signed for Glenavon on 18 December 2020, to the end of the 2020–21 season. He subsequently came off the bench in Glenavon's 2–1 away win against Warrenpoint Town the following day. Following a match against Linfield, Clingan sustained a knee injury which required surgery, effectively ending his playing career. Clingan retired at the end of the 2020–21 NIFL Premiership season.

International career
Clingan has represented Northern Ireland at under-17, under-19 and under-21 levels. He gained six under-21 caps and captained the side. He made his senior debut at the Giants Stadium in New York City against Uruguay during Northern Ireland's two-game tour of the US in May 2006.

His first competitive senior cap came in the 3–0 home defeat by Iceland on 2 September 2006, in the first match of the Euro 2008 qualifying campaign, and he has remained a fixture in the side since then, missing only two matches in the campaign through injury. His free kick set up David Healy's second goal in the 3–2 home victory over Spain on 6 September 2006, and he was named man of the match by the BBC commentary team in the 2–1 home victory over Denmark on 17 November 2007.

Career statistics

Honours
League One runner-up with Nottingham Forest, 2008 (Promotion)
2017&19 Donnelly Scratch Cup Winner at BGC
2021 Balmore Golf Club DLA Scratch Cup Winner

References

External links
IFA profile

1984 births
Living people
Association footballers from Belfast
Association footballers from Northern Ireland
Association football midfielders
Northern Ireland under-21 international footballers
Northern Ireland international footballers
English Football League players
Wolverhampton Wanderers F.C. players
Chesterfield F.C. players
Nottingham Forest F.C. players
Norwich City F.C. players
Coventry City F.C. players
Doncaster Rovers F.C. players
Kilmarnock F.C. players
Scottish Premier League players
Scottish Professional Football League players
Glenavon F.C. players
Linfield F.C. players